Cristian Carracedo García (born 30 November 1995) is a Spanish footballer who plays for Córdoba CF as a right winger.

Club career
Born in L'Hospitalet de Llobregat, Barcelona, Catalonia, Carracedo finished his formation with CF Badalona. On 12 October 2013 he made his senior debut, coming on as a second-half substitute in a 0–2 away loss against Valencia CF Mestalla in the Segunda División B championship.

On 3 August 2015 Carracedo signed for RCD Mallorca, being assigned to the reserves in Tercera División. He made his first team debut on 10 September, starting in a 0–2 home loss against SD Huesca, for the season's Copa del Rey.

References

External links

1995 births
Living people
Footballers from L'Hospitalet de Llobregat
Spanish footballers
Association football wingers
Segunda División B players
Tercera División players
CF Badalona players
RCD Mallorca B players
RCD Mallorca players
CP Cacereño players
Écija Balompié players
Córdoba CF B players
UP Langreo footballers
AD Ceuta FC players
AE Prat players
SD Ejea players